This is a partial list of garden plants, plants that can be cultivated in gardens in North America, listed alphabetically by genus.

A 

 Abelia
 Abeliophyllum (white forsythia)
 Abelmoschus (okra)
 Abies (fir)
 Abroma
 Abromeitiella (obsolete)
 Abronia (sand verbena)
 Abrus
 Abutilon
 Acacia (wattle)
 Acaena
 Acalypha
 Acanthaceae
 Acanthodium
 Acantholimon
 Acanthopale
 Acanthophoenix
 Acanthus
 Acca
 Acer (maple)
 Achariaceae
 Achillea (yarrow)
 Achimenantha (hybrid genus)
 Achimenes
 Acinos (calamint)
 Aciphylla
 Acmena
 Acoelorrhaphe (saw palm)
 Acokanthera
 Aconitum (aconite, monkshood)
 Acorus
 Acradenia
 Acrocomia
 Actaea (baneberry)
 Actinidia (kiwifruit)
 Ada orchid genus
 Adansonia
 Adenandra
 Adenanthos
 Adenia
 Adenium
 Adenocarpus
 Adenophora
 Adenostoma
 Adiantum (maidenhair fern)
 Adlumia
 Adonis
 Adromischus
 Aechmea
 Aegopodium
 Aeonium
 Aerangis (an orchid genus)
 Aerides (an orchid genus)
 Aeschynanthus
 Aesculus
 Aethionema
 Afgekia
 Agapanthus
 Agapetes
 Agastache
 Agathis
 Agathosma
 Agave
 Ageratum
 Aglaia
 Aglaomorpha
 Aglaonema
 Agonis
 Agrimonia
 Agrostemma (corn cockle)
 Agrostis
 Aichryson
 Ailanthus (tree of heaven, etc.)
 Aiphanes
 Aira (hair grass)
 Ajania
 Ajuga (bugleweed)
 Akebia
 Alangium
 Alberta
 Albizia (silk tree)
 Albuca
 Alcea (hollyhock)
 Alchemilla
 Aldrovanda
 Aleurites
 × Aliceara (hybrid genus)
 Alisma (water plantain)
 Alkanna
 Allagoptera
 Allamanda
 Allium (onion)
 Allocasuarina
 Allosyncarpia
 Alloxylon
 Alluaudia
 Alnus (alder)
 Alocasia
 Aloe
 Aloinopsis
 Alonsoa
 Alopecurus (foxtail grass)
 Aloysia
 Alphitonia
 Alpinia (ginger lily)
 Alsobia
 Alstonia
 Alstroemeria
 Alternanthera
 Althaea
 Alyogyne
 Alyssum
 Alyxia
 Amaranthus
 Amarcrinum (hybrid genus)
 Amarygia (hybrid genus)
 Amaryllis
 Amberboa
 Amelanchier
 Amesiella
 Amherstia
 Amicia
 Ammi
 Ammobium
 Amorpha
 Amorphophallus
 Ampelopsis
 Amsonia
 Anacampseros
 Anacardium
 Anacyclus
 Anagallis (pimpernel)
 Ananas (pineapple)
 Anaphalis
 Anchusa
 Andersonia
 Andira
 Androlepis
 Andromeda
 Andropogon
 Androsace
 Anemone (windflower)
 Anemonella
 Anemonopsis
 Anemopaegma
 Anethum (dill)
 Angelica
 Angelonia
 Angiopteris
 Angophora
 Angraecum (an orchid genus)
 Anguloa (an orchid genus)
 Angulocaste (a hybrid orchid genus)
 Anigozanthos
 Anisacanthus
 Anisodontea
 Annona
 Anoda
 Anomatheca (See Freesia)
 Anopterus
 Anredera
 Antennaria
 Anthemis
 Anthericum
 Anthocleista
 Anthotroche
 Anthriscus
 Anthurium
 Anthyllis
 Antidesma
 Antigonon
 Antirrhinum (snapdragon)
 Apera
 Aphelandra
 Aphyllanthes
 Apium
 Apocynum
 Aponogeton
 Apophyllum
 Apodytes
 Aponogeton
 Aporocactus
 Aporoheliocereus (hybrid genus)
 Aprevalia
 Aptenia
 Aquilegia (columbine)
 Arabis (rock cress)
 Arachis
 Arachniodes
 Arachnis (scorpion orchid) (orchid genus)
 Araeococcus
 Araiostegia
 Aralia
 Araucaria (monkey-puzzle)
 Araujia
 Arbutus (madrone)
 Archidendron
 Archontophoenix (king palm)
 Arctium
 Arctostaphylos (bearberry, manzanita)
 Arctotheca
 Arctotis (African daisy)
 Ardisia
 Areca
 Arenaria (sandwort)
 Arenga
 Argemone (prickly poppy)
 Argyranthemum
 Argyreia
 Argyroderma
 Ariocarpus
 Arisaema
 Arisarum
 Aristea
 Aristolochia
 Aristotelia
 Armeria
  Armoracia 
 Arnebia
 Arnica
 Aronia (chokeberry)
 Arrabidaea, see Bignonia magnifica
 Arrhenatherum (oat grass)
 Artanema
 Artabotrys
 Artemisia (mugwort, sagebrush, wormwood)
 Arthrocereus
 Arthropodium
 Artocarpus
 Arum
 Aruncus
 Arundina
 Arundinaria
 Arundo
 Asarina
 Asarum (wild ginger)
 Asclepias (milkweed, silkweed)
 × Ascocenda (hybrid genus) (an orchid genus)
 Ascocentrum an orchid genus
 Asimina
 Asparagus
 Asperula (woodruff)
 Asphodeline
 Asphodelus (asphodel)
 Aspidistra
 Asplenium
 Astelia
 Aster
 Asteranthera
 Astilbe
 Astilboides
 Astragalus (milk vetch)
 Astrantia
 Astrophytum
 Asystasia
 Atalaya
 Athamanta
 Atherosperma
 Athrotaxis
 Athyrium
 Atriplex
 Attalea
 Aubrieta
 Aucuba
 Aulax
 Auranticarpa
 Aurinia
 Austrocedrus
 Austrocylindropuntia
 Austrostipa
 Averrhoa
 Avicennia
 Azadirachta
 Azalea
 Azara
 Azolla (aquatic ferns)
 Azorella
 Azorina
 Aztekium
 Azetura

B 

 Babiana
 Baccharis
 Backhousia
 Bacopa (water hyssop)
 Bactris
 Baeckea
 Baikiaea
 Baileya
 Ballota
 Balsamorhiza (balsam root)
 Bambusa (bamboo)
 Banksia
 Baptisia an orchid genus
 Barbarea (yellow rocket or winter cress)
 Barkeria (an orchid genus)
 Barleria
 Barklya (gold blossom tree)
 Barnadesia
 Barringtonia
 Bartlettina
 Basselinia
 Bassia
 Bauera
 Bauhinia
 Baumea
 × Beallara an orchid hybrid genus
 Beaucarnea
 Beaufortia
 Beaumontia
 Beccariella
 Bedfordia
 Begonia
 Belamcanda
 Bellevalia
 Bellis (daisy)
 Bellium
 Berberidopsis
 Berberis (barberry)
 Berchemia
 Bergenia
 Bergerocactus
 Berkheya
 Berlandiera
 Berrya
 Bertolonia
 Berzelia
 Beschorneria
 Bessera
 Beta (beet)
 Betula (birch)
 Biarum
 Bidens
 Bignonia
 Bikkia
 Billardiera
 Billbergia
 Bischofia
 Bismarckia
 Bixa
 Blandfordia
 Blechnum (hard fern)
 Bletilla (an orchid genus)
 Blighia
 Bloomeria
 Blossfeldia
 Bocconia
 Boenninghausenia
 Bolax
 Bolbitis
 Bollea (an orchid genus)
 Boltonia
 Bolusanthus
 Bomarea
 Bombax
 Bongardia
 Boophone
 Borago
 Borassodendron
 Borassus
 Boronia
 Bosea
 Bossiaea
 Bothriochloa
 Bougainvillea
 Bouteloua
 Bouvardia
 Bowenia
 Bowiea
 Bowkeria
 Boykinia
 Brabejum
 Brachychiton
 Brachyglottis
 Brachylaena
 Brachypodium
 Brachyscome
 Brachysema
 Brachystelma
 Bracteantha
 Brahea (hesper palm)
 Brassavola (an orchid genus)
 Brassaia (octopus tree)
 Brassia (an orchid genus)
 Brassica (mustard, cabbage)
 × Brassidium (hybrid orchids)
 × Brassocattleya (hybrid orchids)
 × Brassolaeliocattleya (trigeneric hybrid orchids)
 Breynia
 Briggsia
 Brillantaisia
 Brimeura
 Briza (quaking grass)
 Brodiaea
 Bromelia
 Broughtonia an orchid genus
 Broussonetia
 Browallia
 Brownea
 Browningia
 Bruckenthalia
 Brugmansia
 Brunfelsia
 Brunia
 Brunnera
 Brunsvigia
 Brya
 Buchloe
 Buckinghamia
 Buddleja
 Buglossoides
 Bulbine
 Bulbinella
 Bulbocodium
 Bulbophyllum (an orchid genus)
 Bulnesia
 Bunchosia
 Buphthalmum
 Bupleurum
 Burchardia
 Burchellia
 × Burrageara an orchid hybrid genus
 Burretiokentia
 Bursaria
 Bursera
 Burtonia
 Butea
 Butia
 Butomus
 Buxus (boxwood)
 Byrsonima
 Bystropogon

C 

 Cabomba
 Cadia
 Caesalpinia (dwarf poinciana, Pride of Barbados)
 Caladium
 Calamagrostis (reed grass, smallweed)
 Calamintha (calamint)
 Calamus
 Calandrinia
 Calanthe an orchid genus
 Calathea
 Calceolaria (slipperwort)
 Calendula (pot marigold)
 Calibanus
 Calibrachoa
 Calla
 Calliandra
 Callianthemum
 Callicarpa (beauty berry)
 Callicoma  (black wattle)
 Callirhoe (poppy mallow)
 Callisia
 Callistemon (bottlebrush)
 Callistephus (Chinese aster)
 Callitriche (water starwort)
 Callitris (cypress pine)
 Calluna (heather)
 Calocedrus (incense cedar)
 Calochone
 Calochortus
 Calodendrum (cape chestnut)
 Calomeria
 Calophaca
 Calophyllum
 Calopyxis
 Caloscordum
 Calothamnus
 Calotropis
 Calpurnia
 Caltha (kingcup, marsh marigold)
 Calycanthus
 Calymmanthium
 Calypso (an orchid genus)
 Calytrix (starflower)
 Camassia (quamash)
 Camellia
 Camoensia
 Campanula (bellflower)
 Campsis (trumpet vine)
 Campylotropsis (See Lespedeza)
 Cananga (ylang ylang)
 Canarina
 Canistrum
 Canna
 Cantua
 Capparis
 Capsicum (pepper)
 Caragana (peashrub)
 Caralluma
 Cardamine (bittercress)
 Cardiocrinum
 Cardiospermum
 Cardwellia
 Carex (sedge)
 Carissa
 Carlina
 Carludovica
 Carmichaelia
 Carnegiea (saguaro)
 Carpentaria
 Carphalea
 Carpinus (hornbeam)
 Carpobrotus
 Carthamus (safflower)
 Carum (caraway)
 Carya (hickory, pecan)
 Caryopteris
 Caryota (fishtail palm)
 Cassia (shower tree)
 Cassinia
 Cassiope
 Cassipourea
 Castanea (chestnut)
 Castanopsis
 Castanospermum (black bean)
 Casuarina (sheoak)
 Catalpa (Indian bean)
 Catananche
 Catasetum (an orchid genus)
 Catha (khat tree)
 Catharanthus (Madagascar periwinkle)
 Catopsis
 Cattleya (an orchid genus)
 Caulophyllum
 Cautleya
 Cavendishia
 Ceanothus (California-lilac)
 Cedrela (toon)
 Cedronella
 Cedrus (cedar)
 Ceiba (kapok)
 Celastrus (staff-vine)
 Celmisia (New Zealand daisy, New Zealand aster)
 Celosia (cockscomb)
 Celtis (hackberry)
 Centaurea
 Centaurium
 Centradenia
 Centranthus (valerian)
 Cephalaria
 Cephalocereus
 Cephalophyllum
 Cephalotaxus (plum-yew)
 Ceraria
 Cerastium
 Ceratonia (St. John's bread, carob bean)
 Ceratopetalum (coachwood)
 Ceratophyllum
 Ceratopteris
 Ceratostigma
 Ceratozamia
 Cerbera (sea mango)
 Cercidiphyllum
 Cercis (Judas tree, redbud)
 Cercocarpus
 Cereus
 Ceropegia
 Cestrum
 Chadsia
 Chaenomeles (flowering quince)
 Chaenorhinum (dwarf snapdragon)
 Chaerophyllum
 Chamaecyparis (false cypress)
 Chamaecytisus
 Chamaedaphne
 Chamaedorea
 Chamaelirium
 Chamaemelum (chamomile)
 Chamaerops
 Chamelaucium (wax flower)
 Chasmanthe
 Chasmanthium
 Cheilanthes
 Cheiridopsis
 Chelidonium
 Chelone (turtlehead)
 Chiastophyllum
 Chiliotrichum
 Chilopsis (desert willow)
 Chimaphila
 Chimonanthus (wintersweet)
 Chimonobambusa
 Chionanthus (fringe tree)
 Chionochloa
 Chirita
 Chlidanthus
 Choisya
 Chonemorpha (Frangipani vine)
 Choricarpia (brush turpentine)
 Chorisia (floss silk tree)
 Chorizema
 Chrysalidocarpus
 Chrysanthemoides
 Chrysanthemum
 Chrysobalanus
 Chrysogonum
 Chrysolepis
 Chrysophyllum (star apple)
 Chrysothemis
 Chusquea
 Cibotium
 Cicerbita
 Cichorium (chicory, endive)
 Cimicifuga (bugbane)
 Cinnamomum (camphor laurel)
 Cionura
 Cirsium
 Cissus
 Cistus (rock rose, sun rose)
 Citharexylum (fiddlewood)
 Citrofortunella (hybrid)
 Citrus (lime, lemon)
 Cladanthus
 Cladrastis
 Clarkia
 Claytonia
 Cleistocactus
 Clematis
 Cleome (spider flower)
 Clerodendrum
 Clethra (summersweet)
 Cleyera
 Clianthus
 Clintonia
 Clitoria
 Clivia
 Clusia
 Clytostoma
 Cobaea
 Coccoloba (sea grape)
 Coccothrinax (thatch palm)
 Cocculus
 Cochlioda an orchid genus
 Cochlospermum (buttercup tree, Maximiliana)
 Cocos (coconut)
 Codiaeum (croton)
 Codonanthe
 Codonopsis
 Coelia
 Coelogyne (an orchid genus)
 Coffea (coffee tree)
 Coix
 Colchicum (autumn crocus, meadow saffron)
 Coleonema
 Colletia
 Collinsia
 Collomia
 Colocasia (taro)
 Colquhounia
 Columnea
 Colutea (bladder senna)
 Coluteocarpus
 Colvillea
 Combretum
 Comesperma
 Commelina (day flower, spiderwort, widow's tears)
 Commersonia
 Commidendrum
 Commiphora
 Comptonella
 Comptonia (Sweetfern)
 Conandron
 Congea
 Conicosia
 Coniogramme
 Conoclinium (mistflower)
 Conophytum
 Conospermum
 Conostylis
 Conradina
 Consolida (larkspur)
 Convallaria (lily-of-the-valley)
 Convolvulus (bindweed, morning glory)
 Copernicia (caranda palm, wax palm)
 Copiapoa syn. Pilocopiapoa
 Coprosma
 Coptis (goldthread)
 Cordia (bird lime tree)
 Cordyline
 Coreopsis (tickseed)
 Coriandrum (coriander cilantro)
 Coriaria
 Cornus (dogwood, cornel)
 Corokia
 Coronilla
 Correa
 Corryocactus
 Cortaderia (pampas grass, tussock grass)
 Cortusa
 Corybas (helmet orchid)
 Corydalis
 Corylopsis (winter-hazel)
 Corylus (hazel, filbert)
 Corymbia
 Corynocarpus
 Corypha
 Coryphantha
 Cosmos
 Costus
 Cotinus (smoke bush)
 Cotoneaster
 Cotula (brass buttons)
 Cotyledon
 Couroupita (cannonball tree)
 Crambe
 Craspedia
 Crassula
 + Crataegomespilus (graft chimera)
 Crataegus (hawthorn)
 × Crataemespilus (hybrid)
 Crepis
 Crescentia (calabash)
 Crinodendron
 Crinum
 Crocosmia (falling stars, montbretia)
 Crocus
 Crossandra (firecracker flower)
 Crotalaria (rattlepod)
 Croton
 Crowea
 Cryptanthus (earth stars)
 Cryptbergia (hybrid)
 Cryptocarya
 Cryptocoryne (water trumpet)
 Cryptomeria (sugi, Japanese cedar)
 Cryptostegia (Indian rubber vine)
 Cryptotaenia
 Ctenanthe
 Cucumis
 Cucurbita
 Cuminum
 Cunila
 Cunninghamia (China-fir)
 Cunonia
 Cupaniopsis (tuckeroo)
 Cuphea
 Cupressus (cypress)
 Cuprocyparis (hybrid)
 Curcuma
 Cussonia
 Cyananthus (trailing bellflower)
 Cyanotis
 Cyathea (tree fern)
 Cyathodes
 Cybistax
 Cycas (cycad, sago palm)
 Cyclamen
 Cycnoches an orchid genus
 Cydista, synonym of Bignonia
 Cydonia (quince)
 Cylindropuntia
 Cymbalaria (ivy-leaved toadflax)
 Cymbidium (an orchid genus)
 Cymbopogon
 Cynara
 Cynodon
 Cynoglossum (hound's tongue)
 Cypella
 Cyperus
 Cyphomandra (tree tomato)
 Cyphostemma
 Cypripedium (lady's slipper; an orchid genus)
 Cyrilla
 Cyrtanthus (fire lily)
 Cyrtomium
 Cyrtostachys
 Cystopteris (bladder fern)
 Cytisus (broom)

D 

 Daboecia
 Dacrydium
 Dactylis
 Dactylorhiza (marsh orchid)
 Dahlia
 Dalea (indigo bush)
 Dalechampia
 Damasonium
 Dampiera
 Danae
 Daphne
 Daphniphyllum
 Darlingia
 Darmera syn. Peltiphyllum
 Darwinia (lemon scented myrtle)
 Dasylirion
 Datura
 Davallia (hare's foot fern)
 Davidia
 Daviesia
 Decaisnea
 × Degarmoara (a hybrid orchid genus)
 Decarya
 Decumaria
 Deinanthe
 Delairea
 Delonix
 Delosperma
 Delphinium
 Dendranthema
 Dendrobium (an orchid genus)
 Dendrocalamus
 Dendrochilum (an orchid genus)
 Dendromecon (tree poppy)
 Denmoza
 Dennstaedtia (Hayscented fern or Cup fern)
 Deppea
 Derris
 Derwentia
 Deschampsia (hair grass)
 Desfontainia
 Desmodium
 Deuterocohnia syn. Abromeitiella
 Deutzia
 Dianella (flax lily)
 Dianthus (carnation, pink)
 Diascia (twinspur)
 Dicentra (bleeding heart)
 Dichelostemma
 Dichondra
 Dichorisandra
 Dichroa
 Dicksonia
 Dicliptera
 Dictamnus (burning bush, dittany)
 Dictyosperma (princess palm)
 Didymochlaena
 Dieffenbachia (dumb cane, mother-in-law's tongue, tuftroot)
 Dierama (African harebell, angel's fishing rod, wand flower)
 Diervilla (bush honeysuckle)
 Dietes
 Digitalis (foxglove)
 Dillenia
 Dillwynia
 Dimorphotheca (African daisy)
 Dionaea (Venus flytrap)
 Dionysia
 Dioon
 Dioscorea syns. Rajania, Tamus, Testudinaria(yam)
 Diospyros (ebony, persimmon)
 Dipcadi
 Dipelta
 Diphylleia
 Diplarrhena (butterfly flag)
 Diplazium
 Diplocyclos
 Diploglottis
 Diplolaena
 Dipsacus (teasel)
 Dipteris
 Dipteronia
 Dipteryx
 Dirca (leatherwood)
 Disa (an orchid genus)
 Disanthus
 Discaria

 Dischidia
 Discocactus
 Disocactus
 Disporopsis
 Disporum (fairy-bells)
 Dissotis
 Distictis
 Distylium
 Dizygotheca
 Docynia
 Dodecatheon (shooting stars, American cowslip), now Primula sect. Dodecatheon
 Dodonaea (hop bush)
 Dolichandrone
 Dombeya
 Doodia (hacksaw fern, rasp fern)
 Doronicum (leopard's bane)
 Dorotheanthus (ice plant, Livingstone daisy)
 Dorstenia
 Doryanthes (spear lily)
 Doryopteris
 Dovyalis
 Draba (whitlow grass)
 Dracaena
 Dracocephalum
 Dracophyllum
 Dracula (an orchid genus)
 Dracunculus
 Dregea
 Drimys
 Drosanthemum
 Drosera (sundew)
 Dryandra
 Dryas (mountain avens)
 Drynaria
 Dryopteris (buckler fern, shield fern, wood fern)
 Duboisia
 Duchesnea (Indian strawberry, mock strawberry)
 Dudleya
 Duranta
 Duvalia
 Dyckia
 Dymondia
 Dypsis syn. Chrysalidocarpus, Neodypsis

E 

 Ebracteola
 Ecballium
 Eccremocarpus
 Echeveria
 Echidnopsis
 Echinacea (coneflower)
 Echinocactus
 Echinocereus
 Echinops (globe thistle)
 Echinopsis
 Echium
 Edgeworthia
 Edithcolea
 Edraianthus
 Egeria
 Ehretia
 Eichhornia (water hyacinth)
 Elaeagnus
 Elaeis (oil palm)
 Elaeocarpus
 Elatostema
 Eleocharis (spike rush)
 Elettaria
 Eleutherococcus
 Elodea (pondweed)
 Elsholtzia
 Elymus (wild rye)
 Embothrium
 Emilia (tasselflower)
 Emmenopterys
 Encelia
 Encephalartos (Kaffir bread)
 Encyclia (an orchid genus)
 Enkianthus
 Ensete
 Eomecon (snow poppy)
 Epacris
 Ephedra (ephedra)
 Epidendrum (an orchid genus)
 Epigaea
 Epilobium
 Epimedium (barrenwort)
 Epipactis (helleborine,  an orchid genus)
 Epiphyllum (orchid cactus)
 Episcia (flame violet)
 Epithelantha
 Equisetum (horsetail)
 Eragrostis (love grass)
 Eranthemum
 Eranthis (winter aconite)
 Ercilla
 Eremophila (emu bush)
 Eremurus
 Erica (heath/heather)
 Erigeron (fleabane)
 Erinacea
 Erinus
 Eriobotrya
 Eriogonum
 Eriophorum (cotton grass)
 Eriophyllum
 Eriostemon (waxflower)
 Eritrichium
 Erodium
 Eryngium (eryngo, sea holly)
 Erysimum (wallflower)
 Erythrina (coral tree)
 Erythronium
 Escallonia
 Eschscholzia (California poppy)
 Escobaria
 Espostoa
 Etlingera
 Eucalyptus (gum tree, ironbark)
 Eucharis
 Eucomis
 Eucommia
 Eucryphia
 Eulophia (an orchid genus)
 Euonymus
 Eupatorium
 Euphorbia (spurge)
 Euptelea
 Eurya
 Euryale ferox
 Euryops
 Eustoma
 Evolvulus
 Exacum
 Exochorda

F 

 Fabiana
 Fagus (beech)
 Fallopia
 Farfugium
 Fargesia
 Fascicularia
 × Fatshedera (hybrid genus)
 Fatsia
 Faucaria
 Felicia (blue daisy)
 Fendlera
 Fenestraria
 Ferocactus
 Ferraria
 Ferula (giant fennel)
 Festuca (fescue)
 Fibigia
 Ficus (fig)
 Ficus pumila
 Filipendula
 Firmiana
 Fittonia
 Fitzroya
 Fockea
 Foeniculum (fennel)
 Fontanesia
 Forsythia
 Fortunella (kumquat)
 Fothergilla
 Fouquieria
 Fragaria (strawberry)
 Frailea
 Francoa
 Frangipani
 Franklinia
 Fraxinus (ash)
 Freesia
 Fremontodendron
 Fritillaria (fritillary)
 Fuchsia
 Furcraea

G 

 Gagea
 Gaillardia
 Galanthus (snowdrop)
 Galax
 Galega
 Galium (bedstraw)
 Galtonia
 Gardenia
 Garrya
 Gasteria
 Gaultheria
 Gaura
 Gaylussacia (huckleberry)
 Gazania
 Geissorhiza
 Gelsemium
 Genista
 Gentiana (gentian)
 Gentianopsis
 Geranium (cranesbill, not same as Pelargonium)
 Gerbera
 Gesneria
 Geum (avens)
 Gevuina
 Gibbaeum
 Gilia
 Gillenia
 Ginkgo
 Gladiolus
 Glaucidium
 Glaucium
 Gleditsia (honey locust)
 Globba
 Globularia (globe daisy)
 Gloriosa
 Glottiphyllum
 Gloxinia
 Glyceria
 Glycyrrhiza
 Gomphocarpus
 Gomphrena
 Goniolimon
 Goodyera (jewel orchid)
 Gordonia
 Graptopetalum
 Graptophyllum
 Graptoveria (hybrid genus)
 Grevillea
 Grewia
 Greyia
 Grindelia
 Griselinia
 Gunnera (dinosaur food)
 Guzmania
 Gymnocalycium
 Gymnocarpium
 Gymnocladus
 Gynandriris
 Gynura
 Gypsophila

H 

 Haageocereus
 Haastia
 Habenaria (an orchid genus)
 Haberlea
 Habranthus
 Haemanthus (blood lily)
 Hakea
 Hakonechloa
 Halesia (silverbell)
 Halimiocistus (hybrid genus)
 Halimium
 Halimodendron
 Hamamelis (witch-hazel)
 Haplopappus
 Hardenbergia (coral pea)
 Harrisia
 Hatiora
 Haworthia
 Hebe
 Hechtia
 Hedera (ivy)
 Hedychium
 Hedyotis (bluets)
 Hedysarum
 Hedyscepe (umbrella palm)
 Helenium (sneezeweed)
 Helianthemum (rock rose)
 Helianthus (sunflower)
 Helichrysum
 Heliconia
 Helictotrichon
 Heliocereus
 Heliophila
 Heliopsis (ox eye)
 Heliotropium (heliotrope)
 Helleborus (hellebore)
 Heloniopsis
 Hemerocallis (daylily)
 Hemigraphis
 Hepatica
 Heptacodium
 Heracleum
 Herbertia
 Hereroa
 Hermannia
 Hermodactylus
 Hesperaloe
 Hesperantha
 Hesperis
 Hesperocallis
 Heterocentron
 Heterotheca
 Heuchera (coral flower)
 × Heucherella (hybrid genus)
 Hibbertia
 Hibiscus (rose of Sharon)
 Hieracium (hawkweed)
 Himalayacalamus
 Hippeastrum (amaryllis)
 Hippocrepis
 Hippophae
 Hohenbergia
 Hohenbergiopsis
 Hoheria
 Holboellia
 Holcus
 Holmskioldia
 Holodiscus
 Homalocladium (ribbon bush)
 Homeria
 Hoodia
 Hordeum (barley)
 Horminum
 Hosta (plantain lily)
 Hottonia
 Houttuynia
 Hovea
 Hovenia
 Howea (sentry palm)
 Hoya (wax flower)
 Huernia
 Humulus (hops)
 Hunnemannia
 Huntleya an orchid genus
 Hyacinthella
 Hyacinthoides
 Hyacinthus (hyacinth)
 Hydrangea
 Hydrastis (goldenseal)
 Hydrocharis (frogbit)
 Hydrocleys
 Hydrocotyle (pennywort)
 Hygrophila
 Hylocereus
 Hylomecon
 Hymenocallis
 Hymenosporum
 Hyophorbe (bottle palm)
 Hyoscyamus (henbane)
 Hypericum (St. John's wort, rose of Sharon)
 Hyphaene (doum palm)
 Hypocalymma
 Hypoestes
 Hypoxis (starflower)
 Hypsela
 Hyssopus (hyssop)

I 

 Iberis (candytuft)
 Ibervillea
 Idesia
 Ilex (holly)
 Illicium
 Impatiens (balsam)
 Imperata
 Incarvillea
 Indigofera
 Inula
 Iochroma
 Ipheion
 Ipomoea (morning glory)
 Ipomopsis
 Iresine
 Iris
 Isatis
 Isoplexis
 Isopyrum
 Itea
 Ixia (corn lily)
 Ixiolirion
 Ixora

J 

 Jaborosa
 Jacaranda
 Jacquemontia
 Jamesia
 Jasione
 Jasminum (jasmine, jessamine)
 Jatropha
 Jeffersonia
 Jovellana
 Jovibarba
 Juanulloa
 Jubaea (Chilean wine palm)
 Juglans (walnut)
 Juncus (rush)
 Juniperus (juniper)
 Justicia

K 

 Kadsura
 Kaempferia
 Kalanchoe
 Kalimeris
 Kalmia (mountain laurel)
 Kalmiopsis
 Kalopanax
 Kelseya
 Kerria
 Kigelia (sausage tree)
 Kirengeshoma
 Kitaibela
 Kleinia
 Knautia
 Knightia
 Kniphofia
 Koeleria (junegrass)
 Koelreuteria (golden rain tree)
 Kohleria
 Kolkwitzia (beautybush)
 Kosteletzkya
 Kunzea

L 

 Lablab
 Laburnocytisus
 Laburnum (laburnum)
 Laccospadix
 Lachenalia (Cape cowslip)
 Laelia (an orchid genus)
 × Laeliocattleya (hybrid orchid genus)
 Lagarosiphon
 Lagenophora
 Lagerstroemia
 Lagunaria
 Lagurus
 Lamarckia
 Lambertia
 Lamium (deadnettle)
 Lampranthus
 Lantana (shrub verbena)
 Lapageria
 Lardizabala
 Larix (larch)
 Larrea (creosote bush)
 Latania (Latan palm)
 Lathraea
 Lathyrus
 Laurelia
 Laurus
 Lavandula (lavender)
 Lavatera (mallow)
 Lawsonia
 Layia
 Ledebouria
 Ledodendron (hybrid genus)
 Ledum
 Leea
 Legousia
 Leiophyllum
 Leipoldtia
 Leitneria
 Lemboglossum
 Lenophyllum
 Leonotis
 Leontice
 Leontopodium (edelweiss)
 Lepidozamia
 Leptinella
 Lechenaultia
 Lespedeza (bush clover)
 Leucadendron
 Leucanthemella
 Leucanthemopsis
 Leucanthemum
 Leuchtenbergia
 Leucocoryne
 Leucogenes
 Leucojum (snowflake)
 Leucophyllum
 Leucophyta
 Leucopogon
 Leucoraoulia (hybrid genus)
 Leucospermum (pincushion)
 Leucothoe
 Lewisia
 Leycesteria
 Leymus
 Liatris
 Libertia
 Libocedrus
 Ligularia
 Ligustrum (privet)
 Lilium (lily)
 Limnanthes
 Limnocharis
 Limonium (sea lavender)
 Linanthus
 Linaria (toadflax)
 Lindelofia
 Lindera
 Lindheimera (star daisy)
 Linnaea (twinflower)
 Linospadix
 Linum (flax)
 Liquidambar (sweetgum)
 Liriodendron (tulip tree)
 Liriope (lilyturf)
 Lithocarpus
 Lithodora
 Lithophragma
 Lithops
 Littonia
 Livistona
 Loasa
 Lobelia
 Lobularia (sweet alyssum)
 Lodoicea (coco de mer)
 Loiseleuria
 Lomandra (mat rush)
 Lomatia
 Lomatium
 Lomatophyllum
 Lonicera (honeysuckle)
 Lopezia
 Lophomyrtus
 Lophospermum
 Lophostemon
 Loropetalum
 Lotus
 Luculia
 Ludwigia
 Luma
 Lunaria
 Lupinus (lupin)
 Luzula (woodrush)
 Lycaste (an orchid genus)
 Lychnis (campion)
 Lycium
 Lycopodium (club moss)
 Lycoris
 Lygodium (climbing fern)
 Lyonia
 Lyonothamnus
 Lysichiton (yellow skunk cabbage)
 Lysiloma
 Lysimachia
 Lythrum (loosestrife)

M 

 Maackia
 Macfadyena
 Machaeranthera
 Mackaya
 Macleania
 Macleaya
 Maclura
 Macropidia
 Macrozamia
 Magnolia
 Mahonia
 Maianthemum (May lily)
 Maihuenia
 Malcolmia
 Malephora
 Malope
 Malpighia
 Malus (apple, crabapple)
 Malva (mallow)
 Malvastrum
 Malvaviscus
 Mammillaria
 Mandevilla
 Mandragora (mandrake)
 Manettia
 Manglietia
 Maranta
 Margyricarpus
 Marrubium (horehound)
 Marsilea (pepperwort)
 Masdevallia (an orchid genus)
 Matteuccia
 Matthiola (stock)
 Maurandella
 Maurandya
 Maxillaria (an orchid genus)
 Maytenus
 Mazus
 Meconopsis
 Medicago (alfalfa)
 Medinilla
 Meehania
 Megacodon
 Megaskepasma
 Melaleuca (paperbark)
 Melasphaerula
 Melastoma
 Melia
 Melianthus
 Melica (melic)
 Melicytus
 Melinis
 Meliosma
 Melissa (balm)
 Melittis (bastard balm)
 Melocactus
 Menispermum (moonseed)
 Mentha (mint)
 Mentzelia (starflower)
 Menyanthes
 Menziesia
 Merendera
 Merremia
 Mertensia
 Mespilus
 Metasequoia (dawn redwood)
 Metrosideros
 Meum
 Mexicoa
 Michauxia
 Michelia
 Microbiota
 Microcachrys
 Microlepia
 Micromeria
 Mikania
 Milium
 Milla
 Millettia
 Miltonia (an orchid genus)
 Miltoniopsis (pansy orchid)
 Mimetes
 Mimosa (mimosa, or sensitive plant)
 Mimulus (monkey flower)
 Mirabilis
 Miscanthus
 Mitchella (partridge berry)
 Mitella
 Mitraria
 Molinia
 Moltkia
 Moluccella
 Monadenium
 Monanthes
 Monarda (bee balm)
 Monardella
 Monstera
 Moraea
 Morina
 Morisia
 Morus (mulberry)
 Mucuna
 Muehlenbeckia
 Mukdenia
 Musa (banana, plantain)
 Muscari (grape hyacinth)
 Mussaenda
 Mutisia
 Myoporum
 Myosotidium
 Myosotis (forget-me-not)
 Myrica
 Myriophyllum (milfoil)
 Myrrhis (sweet cicely)
 Myrsine
 Myrteola
 Myrtillocactus
 Myrtus (myrtle)

N 

 Nandina (heavenly bamboo)
 Narcissus (daffodil)
 Nasturtium (watercress)
 Nautilocalyx
 Nectaroscordum
 Neillia
 Nelumbo (lotus)
 Nematanthus
 Nemesia
 Nemopanthus (mountain holly)
 Nemophila
 Neobuxbaumia
 Neolitsea
 Neolloydia
 Neomarica
 Neoporteria
 Neoregelia
 Nepenthes (pitcher plant)
 Nepeta (catmint)
 Nephrolepis
 Nerine
 Nerium (oleander)
 Nertera
 Nicandra
 Nicotiana (tobacco)
 Nidularium
 Nierembergia
 Nigella
 Nipponanthemum
 Nolana
 Nomocharis
 Nopalxochia
 Nothofagus (southern beech)
 Notholirion
 Nothoscordum (false garlic)
 Notospartium
 Nuphar (spatterdock)
 Nymania
 Nymphaea (waterlily)
 Nymphoides (floating heart)
 Nyssa (tupelo)

O 

 Obregonia
 Ochagavia
 Ochna
 Ocimum
 × Odontioda (hybrid orchid genus)
 × Odontocidium (hybrid orchid genus)
 Odontoglossum (an orchid genus)
 Odontonema
 × Odontonia (hybrid orchid genus)
 Oemleria
 Oenanthe (water dropwort)
 Oenothera (evening primrose, sundrops)
 Olea (olive)
 Olearia (daisy bush)
 Olneya
 Olsynium
 Omphalodes (navelwort)
 Omphalogramma
 Oncidium (an orchid genus)
 Onoclea
 Ononis (restharrow)
 Onopordum
 Onosma
 Oophytum
 Ophiopogon (lilyturf)
 Ophrys (an orchid genus)
 Oplismenus
 Opuntia (prickly pears, chollas and many other cactus species)
 Orbea
 Orbeopsis
 Orchis (an orchid genus)
 Oreocereus
 Origanum (marjoram, oregano)
 Orixa
 Ornithogalum
 Orontium (golden club)
 Orostachys
 Oroya
 Ortegocactus
 Orthophytum
 Orthrosanthus
 Orychophragmus
 Oryza (rice)
 Osbeckia
 Osmanthus
 Osmunda (royal fern)
 Osteomeles
 Osteospermum
 Ostrowskia (giant bellflower)
 Ostrya
 Othonna
 Ourisia
 Oxalis (shamrock, sorrel)
 Oxydendrum
 Oxypetalum
 Ozothamnus

P 

 Pachistima
 Pachycereus
 Pachycormus
 Pachycymbium
 Pachyphragma
 Pachyphytum
 Pachypodium
 Pachysandra
 Pachystachys
 Pachystegia
 Pachystima
 Pachyveria (hybrid genus)
 Paeonia (peony)
 Paliurus
 Pamianthe
 Panax (ginseng)
 Pancratium (sea lily)
 Pandanus (screw pine)
 Pandorea
 Panicum
 Pansy 
 Papaver (poppy)
 Paphiopedilum (slipper orchid)
 Paradisea (paradise lily)
 Parahebe
 Paraquilegia
 Parkinsonia
 Parnassia
 Parochetus
 Parodia
 Paronychia
 Parrotia
 Parrotiopsis
 Parthenocissus
 Passiflora (granadilla, passionflower)
 Patersonia
 Patrinia
 Paulownia
 Paurotis
 Pavonia
 Pedilanthus
 Pediocactus
 Pelargonium (geranium)
 Pellaea
 Peltandra (arrow arum)
 Peltoboykinia
 Peltophorum
 Peniocereus
 Pennisetum
 Penstemon
 Pentachondra
 Pentaglottis
 Pentas
 Peperomia
 Peraphyllum
 Pereskia
 Perezia
 Pericallis
 Perilla
 Periploca
 Perovskia (now included in Salvia)
 Pernettya (now included in Gaultheria)
 Persea
 Persicaria (fleeceflower, knotweed)
 Petasites (butterbur, sweet coltsfoot)
 Petrea
 Petrocosmea
 Petrophile
 Petrophytum
 Petrorhagia
 Petroselinum (parsley)
 Petteria
 Petunia
 Phacelia
 Phaedranassa (queen lily)
 Phaius (an orchid genus)
 Phalaenopsis (moth orchid)
 Phalaris
 Phebalium
 Phegopteris (beech fern)
 Phellodendron (cork tree)
 Philadelphus (mock orange)
 Philageria (hybrid genus)
 Philesia
 Phillyrea
 Philodendron
 Phlebodium
 Phlomis
 Phlox
 Phoenix (date palm)
 Phormium
 Photinia
 Phragmipedium (an orchid genus)
 Phragmites (reed)
 Phuopsis
 Phygelius
 Phylica (Cape myrtle)
 × Phylliopsis (hybrid genus)
 Phyllocladus (toatoa)
 Phyllodoce
 Phyllostachys
 Phyllothamnus (hybrid genus)
 Physalis (ground cherry)
 Physaria (bladderpod)
 Physocarpus
 Physoplexis
 Physostegia
 Phyteuma
 Phytolacca (pokeweed)
 Picea (spruce)
 Picrasma
 Pieris
 Pilea
 Pileostegia
 Pilosella
 Pilosocereus
 Pimelea
 Pimpinella
 Pinanga
 Pinckneya
 Pinellia
 Pinguicula (butterwort)
 Pinus (pine)
 Piper (pepper)
 Piptanthus
 Pisonia
 Pistacia (pistachio)
 Pistia
 Pitcairnia
 Pithecellobium
 Pittosporum
 Pityrogramma
 Plantago (plantain)
 Platanus (plane tree, sycamore)
 Platycarya
 Platycerium (staghorn fern)
 Platycladus (Chinese arborvitae)
 Platycodon (balloon flower)
 Platystemon (creamcups)
 Plectranthus an orchid genus
 Pleioblastus
 Pleione (an orchid genus)
 Pleiospilos (living granite)
 Pleurothallis (an orchid genus)
 Plumeria (frangipani)
 Poa
 Podalyria
 Podocarpus
 Podophyllum (mayapple)
 Podranea
 Polemonium (jacob's ladder, abscess root)
 Polianthes
 Poliothyrsis
 Polygala (milkwort, seneca, snakeroot)
 Polygonatum
 Polygonum (knotweed, knotgrass)
 Polypodium
 Polyscias
 Polystichum
 Poncirus
 Pongamia
 Pontederia (pickerel weed)
 Populus (aspen, poplar, cottonwood)
 Porana
 Portea
 Portulaca (purslane, moss rose)
 Portulacaria
 Posoqueria
 Potamogeton
 Potentilla (cinquefoil)
 Pothos
 × Potinara (hybrid orchid genus)
 Pratia
 Primula (primrose)
 Prinsepia
 Pritchardia
 Proboscidea (unicorn plant)
 Promenaea an orchid genus
 Prosopis (mesquite)
 Prostanthera (mint bush)
 Protea
 Prumnopitys
 Prunella (self-heal)
 Prunus (almond, apricot, cherry, peach, plum)
 Pseuderanthemum
 Pseudocydonia
 Pseudolarix (golden-larch)
 Pseudopanax
 Pseudosasa
 Pseudotsuga (douglas-fir)
 Pseudowintera
 Psilotum
 Psychopsis (butterfly orchid)
 Psylliostachys (statice)
 Ptelea
 Pteris (brake, table fern)
 Pterocactus
 Pterocarya (wingnut)
 Pteroceltis
 Pterocephalus
 Pterodiscus
 Pterostyrax
 Ptilotus
 Ptychosperma
 Pueraria
 Pulmonaria (lungwort)
 Pulsatilla
 Pultenaea
 Punica (pomegranate)
 Purshia
 Puschkinia
 Putoria
 Puya
 Pycnanthemum
 Pycnostachys
 Pyracantha (firethorn)
 Pyrola (wintergreen)
 Pyrostegia
 Pyrrosia
 Pyrus (pear)

Q 

 Quamoclit
 Quaqua
 Quercus (oak)
 Quesnelia
 Quisqualis
 Quince

R 

 Ramonda
 Ranunculus (buttercup, crowfoot)
 Ranzania
 Raoulia
 Raphia (raffia)
 Ratibida
 Ravenala (traveler's tree)
 Rebutia
 Rehderodendron
 Rehmannia
 Reineckea
 Reinwardtia
 Reseda (Mignonette)
 Retama
 Rhamnus
 Rhaphidophora
 Rhaphiolepis
 Rhapidophyllum (needle palm)
 Rhapis (lady palm)
 Rheum (rhubarb)
 Rhexia
 Rhipsalis
 Rhodanthe (strawflower)
 Rhodanthemum
 Rhodiola
 Rhodochiton
 Rhododendron
 Rhodohypoxis
 Rhodophiala
 Rhodothamnus
 Rhodotypos
 Rhoeo
 Rhoicissus
 Rhombophyllum
 Rhus (sumac)
 Rhynchelytrum
 Rhynchostylis (an orchid genus)
 Ribes (currant)
 Richea
 Ricinus (castor-oil plant)
 Rigidella
 Robinia
 Rodgersia
 Rodriguezia an orchid genus
 Rohdea
 Romanzoffia
 Romneya (Matilija poppy, tree poppy)
 Romulea
 Rondeletia
 Rosa (rose)
 Roscoea
 Rosmarinus (rosemary)
 Rossioglossum an orchid genus
 Rothmannia
 Roystonea (royal palm)
 Rubus (raspberry)
 Rudbeckia (coneflower)
 Ruellia
 Rumex (dock)
 Rumohra
 Rupicapnos
 Ruschia
 Ruscus
 Russelia
 Ruta (rue)

S 

 Sabal (palmetto)
 Saccharum (plume grass, sugar cane)
 Sadleria
 Sagina (pearlwort)
 Sagittaria (arrowhead)
 Salix (willow)
 Salpiglossis
 Salvia (sage)
 Salvinia
 Sambucus (elder)
 Sanchezia
 Sandersonia
 Sanguinaria (bloodroot)
 Sanguisorba (burnet)
 Sanicula
 Sansevieria
 Santolina
 Sanvitalia (creeping zinnia)
 Sapindus
 Sapium (tallow tree)
 Saponaria (soapwort)
 Sarcocapnos
 Sarcocaulon
 Sarcococca
 Saritaea, see Bignonia magnifica
 Sarmienta
 Sarracenia (pitcher plant)
 Sasa
 Sassafras
 Satureja (savory)
 Sauromatum
 Saxegothaea
 Saxifraga (saxifrage)
 Scabiosa (scabious plant)
 Scadoxus (blood lily)
 Scaevola
 Schefflera
 Schima
 Schinus
 Schisandra
 Schizachyrium
 Schizanthus
 Schizopetalon
 Schizophragma
 Schizostylis
 Schlumbergera
 Schoenoplectus
 Schomburgkia an orchid genus
 Schotia
 Schwantesia
 Sciadopitys
 Scilla (including the former genus Chionodoxa)
 Scindapsus
 Scirpoides
 Sclerocactus
 Scoliopus
 Scopolia
 Scrophularia (figwort)
 Scutellaria
 Securinega
 Sedum (stonecrop)
 Selaginella
 Selago
 Selenicereus
 Selinum
 Semele
 Semiaquilegia
 Semiarundinaria
 Sempervivum (hens and chicks)
 Senecio (ragwort)
 Senna
 Sequoia (coast redwood)
 Sequoiadendron (giant sequoia)
 Seriphidium
 Serissa
 Serruria
 Sesbania
 Sesleria
 Setaria
 Shepherdia
 Shibataea
 Shortia
 Sibiraea
 Sidalcea
 Sideritis
 Silene (campion)
 Silphium
 Silybum
 Simmondsia (jojoba)
 Sinningia
 Sinofranchetia
 Sinojackia
 Sinowilsonia
 Sisyrinchium
 Skimmia
 Smilacina
 Smilax
 Smithiantha
 Smyrnium
 Sobralia an orchid genus
 Solandra
 Solanum (potato, nightshade)
 Soldanella (snowbell)
 Soleirolia
 Solenopsis
 Solenostemon
 Solidago (goldenrod)
 Solidaster (supposedly hybrid genus; see Solidago)
 Sollya
 Sonerila
 Sophora
 × Sophrolaeliocattleya (trigeneric hybrid orchid)
 Sophronitis (an orchid genus)
 Sorbaria
 Sorbus (rowan, whitebeam)
 Sorghastrum
 Sparaxis
 Sparganium (bur-reed)
 Sparrmannia
 Spartina (cord grass)
 Spartium (broom)
 Spathiphyllum
 Spathodea
 Sphaeralcea
 Spigelia
 Spiraea (spirea)
 Sprianthes (an orchid genus)
 Sporobolus
 Sprekelia
 Stachys (betony)
 Stachyurus
 Stangeria
 Stanhopea (an orchid genus)
 Stapelia
 Stapelianthus
 Staphylea (bladdernut)
 Stauntonia
 Stenanthium
 Stenocactus
 Stenocarpus
 Stenocereus
 Stenomesson
 Stenotaphrum
 Stenotus
 Stephanandra
 Stephanocereus
 Stephanotis
 Sternbergia
 Stigmaphyllon
 Stipa
 Stokesia
 Stomatium
 Stratiotes
 Strelitzia (bird of paradise)
 Streptocarpus (Cape primrose)
 Streptosolen
 Strobilanthes
 Stromanthe
 Strombocactus
 Strongylodon
 Stuartia
 Stylidium
 Stylophorum
 Styphelia
 Styrax
 Succisa
 Sulcorebutia
 Sutera
 Sutherlandia
 Swainsona
 Swainsonia
 Syagrus
 Sycoparrotia (hybrid genus)
 Sycopsis
 Symphoricarpos (snowberry)
 Symphyandra
 Symphytum (comfrey)
 Symplocos
 Synadenium
 Syneilesis
 Syngonium
 Synthyris
 Syringa (lilac)
 Syzygium (rose apple)

T 

 Tabebuia
 Tabernaemontana
 Tacca
 Tagetes (Mexican or French marigold)
 Talinum (fameflower)
 Tamarix (tamarisk)
 Tanacetum (tansy)
 Tanakaea
 Tapeinochilos
 Taxodium (bald cypress)
 Taxus (yew)
 Tecoma
 Tecomanthe
 Tecomaria
 Tecophilaea
 Telekia
 Telephium
 Tellima
 Telopea (waratah)
 Templetonia
 Terminalia
 Ternstroemia
 Tetracentron
 Tetradium (bee tree)
 Tetranema
 Tetraneuris
 Tetrapanax
 Tetrastigma
 Tetratheca
 Teucrium
 Thalia
 Thalictrum
 Thelesperma
 Thelocactus
 Thelypteris
 Thermopsis
 Thespesia
 Thevetia
 Thlaspi
 Thrinax (thatch palm)
 Thryptomene (heath myrtle)
 Thuja (thuja, arborvitae)
 Thujopsis (hiba)
 Thunbergia
 Thymophylla
 Thymus (thyme)
 Tiarella
 Tibouchina
 Tigridia
 Tilia (linden)
 Tillandsia (air plant, Spanish moss)
 Tipuana
 Titanopsis
 Tithonia (Mexican sunflower)
 Todea
 Tolmiea
 Tolpis
 Toona
 Torenia
 Torreya (nutmeg yew)
 Tovara
 Townsendia
 Trachelium
 Trachelium caeruleum (blue throatwort)
 Trachelospermum
 Trachycarpus (chusan palm)
 Trachymene
 Tradescantia (spiderwort)
 Trapa (water caltrop)
 Trichodiadema
 Trichosanthes
 Tricyrtis (toad lily)
 Trientalis
 Trifolium (clover)
 Trillium
 Tripetaleia
 Tripterygium
 Triteleia (triplet lily)
 Tritonia
 Trochodendron
 Trollius (globeflower)
 Tropaeolum (nasturtium)
 Tsuga (hemlock)
 Tsusiophyllum
 Tuberaria
 Tulbaghia
 Tulipa (tulip)
 Tweedia
 Tylecodon
 Typha (cattail)

U 

 Uebelmannia
 Ugni
 Ulex (gorse)
 Ulmus (elm)
 Umbellularia
 Uncinia
 Uniola
 Urceolina
 Urginea
 Ursinia
 Utricularia (bladderwort)
 Uvularia (merrybells, bellwort)

V 

 Valeriana (garden valerian)
 Vallea
 Vancouveria
 Vanda (an orchid genus)
 Vanilla an orchid genus
 Veitchia
 Vellozia
 Veltheimia
 Veratrum
 Verbascum (mullein)
 Verbena
 Vernonia (ironweed)
 Veronica (speedwell)
 Veronicastrum
 Verticordia
 Vestia
 Viburnum
 Victoria (giant waterlily)
 Vigna (cowpea and various beans)
 Viguiera
 Vinca (periwinkle)
 Viola (pansy, violet)
 Virgilia
 Viscaria
 Vitaliana
 Vitex
 Vitis (grape)
 Vriesea

W 

 Wachendorfia
 Wahlenbergia
 Waldsteinia
 Washingtonia
 Watsonia
 Weberocereus
 Wedelia
 Weigela
 Weingartia
 Weldenia
 Welwitschia
 Westringia
 Widdringtonia
 Wigandia
 Wigginsia
 Wikstroemia
 Wilsonaria (hybrid orchid genus)
 Wisteria
 Wittrockia
 Wolffia
 Woodsia
 Woodwardia (chain fern)
 Worsleya
 Wulfenia

X 

 Xanthoceras
 Xanthorhiza
 Xanthosoma
 Xeranthemum
 Xerophyllum
 Xylosma

Y 

 Yucca
 Yushania

Z 

 Zaluzianskya
 Zamia
 Zamioculcas
 Zantedeschia (calla lily)
 Zanthoxylum
 Zauschneria
 Zea (maize)
 Zelkova
 Zenobia
 Zephyranthes
 Zigadenus
 Zinnia
 Zizania (wild rice)
 Zygopetalum (an orchid genus)

See also
 List of culinary fruits
 List of foods
 List of vegetables
 List of leaf vegetables
 Lists of plants

Garden
 
Plants